
Gold Creek may refer to:

Populated places

Australia
Gold Creek Village, Canberra, Australia

United States
Gold Creek, Arkansas, an unincorporated community
Gold Creek, Nevada, a ghost town

Bodies of water

United States
Gold Creek (Montana)
Gold Creek (Washington)
Gold Creek (Juneau, Alaska)

Other places
Gold Creek (Queensland), Australia
Gold Creek (British Columbia), a tributary of the Fraser River, Canada
 Golden River or Golden Water River, in the outer court of the Forbidden City, Beijing, China

See also
Goldcreek, Montana, also known as "Gold Creek"
Little Gold Creek, a border crossing between Dawson City, Yukon and Tok, Alaska